The American Association of Independent Music (A2IM) is a trade association that represents independent record labels in the United States, founded in 2005. A2IM is headquartered in New York City, with chapters located in Nashville, Chicago, Northern California, Southern California, and the Pacific Northwest. Among other events, they organize the annual Libera Awards.

The organization was preceded by the National Association of Independent Record Distributors (NAIRD) founded in 1972, which in 1997 changed its name to the Association for Independent Music (AFIM), which dissolved in 2004.

History
A2IM launched on July 5, 2005. The organization has some 600 independent music label members and over 200 associate members (companies who don't own masters but rely upon, provide services for, or otherwise support independent music labels). A2IM was preceded by the National Association of Independent Record Distributors (NAIRD) founded in 1972. In 1997 it changed its name to the Association for Independent Music (AFIM). As AFIM, the organization was best known for the annual issuing of Indie Awards, recognizing artistic and commercial success among artists signed to independent music labels. These were known as "NAIRD awards" prior to the name change. The AFIM Indie Awards were last issued in 2003, and the organization dissolved in 2004. The name "Indie Award" has since been adopted by the Canadian Music Week convention.

Events
While A2IM presents events for members and non-members alike in various cities, they are best known for their three large scale flagship events – IndieWeek, an independent music focused conference located in New York City, the Libera Awards, an independent music award show located in New York City, and Synchup, an independent music licensing and digital conference located in Los Angeles.

Libera Awards

The Libera Awards occur annually to honor contributions to independent music.

Structure
 A2IM's president and CEO is Richard James Burgess.

The organization's board of directors is composed of the following:
Stephanie Alexa - ATO Records VP of Finance and Licensing  
Craig Balsam - Razor & Tie CEO and Co-founder  
Glenn Dicker - Yep Roc Records Founder  
Amy Deitz - INgrooves EVP and GM  
Dave Hansen - Epitaph Records/Anti General Manager  
Andrew Kautz - Big Machine Label Group COO  
Martin Mills - Beggars Group Founder/CEO  
Louis Posen - Hopeless Records Founder/CEO  
Scott Robinson - Dualtone Records CEO/Co-founder  
Tom Silverman - Tommy Boy Founder/CEO 
Darius Van Arman - Secretly Label Group Co-Owner

The organization's president's advisory committee is composed of: 
Alisa Coleman - ABKCO Music & Records COO  
Randy Chin - VP Records President 
Amit Nerurkar - Mass Appeal Records General Manager .

Associations
It is a member of the World Independent Network, which represents most of the world's independent music label trade organizations.

References

Further reading

External links

A2IM Indie Week
The Libera Awards

Music industry associations
Music organizations based in the United States
Organizations based in New York City
Organizations established in 1939